Mofegiline (MDL-72,974) is a selective, irreversible inhibitor of monoamine oxidase B (MAO-B) and semicarbazide-sensitive amine oxidase (SSAO) which was under investigation for the treatment of Parkinson's disease and Alzheimer's disease, but was never marketed.

See also 
 Ladostigil
 Lazabemide
 Rasagiline
 Selegiline

References 

Abandoned drugs
Antidementia agents
Antiparkinsonian agents
Monoamine oxidase inhibitors